LÉ Aoife (P22) of the Irish Naval Service, now known as P62 of the Maritime Squadron of the Armed Forces of Malta, was built as an offshore patrol vessel in 1978.

Serving the Irish Naval Service since 1979, Aoife was decommissioned by Ireland in 2015, and donated to the Armed Forces of Malta. It was commissioned as the patrol boat P62 on 28 June 2015, and is currently Malta's largest naval vessel.

Operational history

Irish service

Originally named after Aoife, step-mother to the children of Lir, Aoife operated primarily as a fisheries protection vessel. Aoife also assisted however in emergency rescue operations and other naval support roles.

Challenger  left New York Harbour on 26 June 1986 and refueled, as prearranged, at an oil rig on the Grand Banks of Newfoundland. However, four tons of water also entered her tanks and soon, Challenger needed more fuel filters. Branson's London control centre requested help from the RAF but the Royal Navy did not have a ship in the area. Aoife, 160 miles distant, was informed and an RAF Nimrod dropped a canister of filters to Challenger. Aoife reached Challenger at 00:43 on 29 June. Her crew refueled Challenger, which went on to complete the voyage, taking two hours and nine minutes off the previous record. Branson invited representatives of the ships company to the celebrations in London, saying "We could not have succeeded without their help".

In July 2007, Aoife assisted in the rescue of over 100 children taking part in a sailing regatta off Dun Laoghaire Harbour.

Despite the ship's home port being Haulbowline Island in Cork Harbour, it had a close relationship with the city of Waterford and its crew were involved in fund-raising for the children's ward of the University Hospital Waterford.

LÉ Aoife was decommissioned in Waterford on 31 January 2015 and later donated to Malta.

Maltese service

Aoife was commissioned into the Maritime Squadron of the Armed Forces of Malta on 28 June 2015, and given the pennant number P62. It arrived in Malta in November 2015, intended initially for use in humanitarian operations in the Mediterranean.

On 24 May 2019, P62 was involved in the recovery of a WWII aircraft engine off the Grand Harbour. The engine, most probably that of a Short Sunderland flying boat, was retrieved after a 14-hour operation.

During 2020, the ship participated in joint training operations with the Royal Netherlands Navy and Hellenic Navy.

Footnotes

References

1979 ships
Former naval ships of the Republic of Ireland
Deirdre-class offshore patrol vessels
Naval ships of Malta
Ships built in Ireland